Kərimbəyli, Nakhchivan may refer to:
Kərimbəyli, Babek, Azerbaijan
Kərimbəyli, Sharur, Azerbaijan